Fried mushrooms or battered mushrooms are a dish made by the frying or deep frying of edible mushrooms, sometimes after dipping them in batter.

In Canada, the United States, United Kingdom and other countries, they are often served as an appetizer or snack, often with ranch dressing, garlic mayonnaise or barbecue sauce, and sometimes with spices added to the batter for flavor. These spices are similar to those used in preparing stuffed mushrooms. In the United Kingdom, battered mushrooms are sometimes sold by fish and chip shops.

See also

 List of hors d'oeuvre

References

Appetizers
Edible fungi
Deep fried foods